Stadion u Murinu, or Stadion Lugovi, is a football stadium in Murino, Plav Municipality, Montenegro. Situated in the valley of Lim river, it is used for football matches. It is the home ground of FK Polimlje.

History
FK Polimlje played their games during the decades at the bank of Lim river. But, during the first half of the nineties, a new pitch was built with fences, offices and dressing rooms. The stadium has no stands and doesn't meet criteria for any league competitions except the bottom rank.

Pitch and conditions
The pitch measures 110 x 70 meters. The stadium meet criteria only for Montenegrin Third League games, not for highest-rank competitions.

See also
FK Polimlje Murino
Murino
Plav, Montenegro

References

External links
 Stadium information

Football venues in Montenegro
Football in Montenegro